t Veld is a village in the Dutch province of North Holland. It is a part of the municipality of Hollands Kroon, and lies about 8 km north of Heerhugowaard.

The village was first mentioned between 1839 and 1859 as "'t Veld", and means "field".

References

Populated places in North Holland
Hollands Kroon